Trine Dyrholm (born 15 April 1972) is a Danish actress, singer and songwriter. Dyrholm received national recognition when she placed third in the Dansk Melodi Grand Prix as a 14-year-old singer. Four years later, she again achieved national recognition when she won the Bodil Award for Best Actress in her debut film: the teenage romance Springflod. Dyrholm has won the Bodil Award for Best Actress five times and a Bodil award for Best Supporting Actress twice as well as six Robert Awards in her acting career.

Career 
When Dyrholm was eight years old, she began performing with the Odense orchestra. At the age of 10, she performed in Et juleeventyr (A Christmas Carol) at the Odense Teater and in summer stock in Den Fynske Landsby. In 1987, at 14 years old, Dyrholm made her breakthrough as the lead singer in Trine & The Moonlighters when the group placed third in the Danish Melodi Grand Prix with the song Danse i måneskin (Dancing in Moonlight). After her Grand Prix success, Dyrholm recorded a CD of her own songs.

Dyrholm attended the Statens Teaterskole (Danish National School of Theatre) from 1991 to 1995. In 1995, she debuted in En skærsommernatsdrøm at Grønnegårds Teatret. Dyrholm earned national recognition with her screen debut in the 1990 teenage romance Springflod for which she received the 1991 Bodil Award for Best Actress. That same year, she earned glowing reviews for her role in the TV production of Hosekrammeren. Thereafter she appeared in Morten Lorentzen's films Casanova (1990) and Cecilie (1991), and then Thomas Vinterberg's De største helte (The Greatest Heroes) in 1996. In 1998, Dyrholm played the role of the hotel maid in the first Dogme 95 film, Festen (The Celebration).

In 2004, Dyrholm played the role of Kate in Kim Fupz Aakeson's drama Forbrydelser (International title: In Your Hands) for which she won both the Bodil Award and the Robert Award. In 2005, Dyrholm again received the Bodil for her leading role in the thriller Fluerne på væggen (Flies on the Wall). The following year, Dyrholm again won both the Bodil and Robert awards for the quirky satire En Soap. In 2007, Trine Dyrholm was again nominated for both the Bodil and Robert awards for her supporting role in Simon Staho's film Daisy Diamond.

She sang songs for the comedy show "Mr. Nice Guy". Three songs from "Mr. Nice Guy" with lyrics by Peter Lund Madsen and Anders Lund Madsen and music by Kim Larsen were released as an EP entitled Mr. Nice Guy. The songs were sung by the leading actress for the comedy play, Trine Dylholm, and musical accompaniment by Emil de Waal's band. The EP has been number one on the Danish music charts for a total of 62 weeks. It stayed in the Top 20 from 17 December 2004 until 2 November 2007, more than 136 weeks on the charts.

In 2011, Dyrholm won the Bodil Award for Best Actress for her performance in the thriller Hævnen which received the Best Foreign Language Film at the 83rd Academy Awards.

In 2014 she was selected as a member of the jury for the 64th Berlin International Film Festival.

She has appeared in both series of Arvingerne (The Legacy), in which she plays the character of Gro Grønnegaard. In 2015, Dyrholm won the Robert Award for Best Actress in a Leading Television Role for her performance in that series.

Filmography

TV series

Discography 
 1987: Danse i Måneskin, Eldorado Records
 1988: Blå & Hvide Striber, (with Rock-Nalle), Banzai Records
 1988: Et Frossent Ojeblik, It's Magic
 2004: Mr. Nice Guy
 2005: Den Store Day

References

External links 

 
 Trine Dyrholm at Den Danske Film Database (in Danish)

1972 births
20th-century Danish actresses
21st-century Danish actresses
21st-century Danish  women singers
Best Actress Bodil Award winners
Best Supporting Actress Bodil Award winners
Danish child actresses
Danish  women singer-songwriters
Danish voice actresses
Living people
People from Odense
Silver Bear for Best Actress winners
Best Actress Robert Award winners